The Paseo de Tacón, or Paseo Militar, was created by the Captain General Miguel Tacón y Rosique (1834–1838) who promoted the reform of the “road” that, starting from the calles of San Luis de Gonzaga (Reina) and Belascoáin, connected to the Castillo del Príncipe. Calle Belascoáin was the edge between the city and the countryside.

History

Avenida Carlos III, was a promenade that Captain General (Spanish: Capitanía General de Cuba) Miguel Tacón y Rosique, put into operation in 1836. When first created, it was called the Paseo de Tacón. Years later, the name was changed to Carlos III in honor of the King of Spain, a statue of the king was erected. Avenida de Carlos III begins at the intersection with the Ayestarán and Presidente Menocal or Calle Infanta.

The beautification plan of Havana by the engineer Mariano Carrillo de Albornoz during the third decade of the nineteenth century, contemplated the construction of a comfortable and beautiful walk that would serve for the recreation of the city's residents who were already spreading to more and more of its original city limits and as framed by the original wall that protected them from foreign attacks.

The Paseo de Tacón would allow for better communication with the colonial troops in the Castillo del Príncipe, because until then it was difficult to reach that military installation by having to circumvent a low and muddy road that became practically impassable in times of rains.

Tacón said about this project:
“It lacked the capital of a country walk where you could breathe the pure and free air, and I resolved to undertake it from the field that they call from Peñalver to the hillside where the Prince's castle is located. It was this site, once swampy and watery, the most on purpose for a work of this kind in the surroundings of this city, in the part where it is not surrounded by the sea. There was also another reason that turned the work into doubly useful, which was the frank communication of this square with the castle, interrupted by that part in the rainy season. ”

Well-known since the time of the monarchy by the name Carlos III, the street is now officially called Avenida Salvador Allende. It is more than 50 meters in width and serves to direct traffic to and from the oldest areas of Havana. It has four lanes of traffic and is the widest historic traffic artery in the city.

See also

 Campo de Marte, Havana

 Quinta de los molinos

 Plaza del Vapor, Havana
 Palacio de Aldama
 Barrio de San Lázaro, Havana

Notes

References

External links
 De Carlos III a Reina

Buildings and structures in Havana
Neoclassical architecture in Cuba
Streets in Havana
Wards of Havana
History of Havana
Municipalities of Havana
Historic districts